The Sri Lakshmi Narasimha Temple is the foremost temple of Gowda Saraswatha Brahmins in and around Thalassery.

The Temple is located in the heart of Thalassery town, in the Kannur district of Kerala. The temple and the prathishta faces North which is a unique feature. The temple was established in 1831 A.D.

History 
A small group of GSBs migrated from Goa settled in Tellichery in the latter half of 17th century and early part of 18th century. They built a small shrine dedicated to Lord Kodanda Rama, in the Tellichery town.

A Rich GSB Merchant named Devdas Bhandari submitted the Idol of Lord Lakshmi Narasimha to the shrine in the early 19th Century. A proper temple was built in the site of the old shrine in 1831. This prathishta was done by H.H. Srimad Sumatheendra Tirtha Swamiji in 1831 A.D. on Samvatrasra Vaishaka masa Shukla Panchami, Monday, Punarvasu Nakshtra of the Shaka era. H.H.Srimad Sumatheendra Tirtha was the 15th pontiff of Sri Kashi Mutt Samsthan, Varanasi. Apart from the Main Deity of Lord Lakshmi Narasimha the Deities of Lord Kodanda Rama, Lord Venkataramana with his divine consorts  of Sri Devi and Bhoomi Devi were installed.

Garbha Griha 
The Garbhagriha or sanctum sanctorum is where the Main idol or Moola Vigraha is placed. 
The Garbha Griha in the temple is a ‘Bahu-vera Vidhana’ i.e. more than one idol is installed in the same Garbha Griha.  Garbha Griha has a three tiered "Simhasana" or throne on which the deities are installed.

Deities

Moola Vigrahas or Predominant Deities or Main Deities
On the top most level in the centre is Lord Sri Lakshmi Narasimha, flanked by Sri Pattabhi Narasimha and Veera Vittala on either side. On the second tier are Lord Kodanda Rama along with Sri Lakshmana and Sita Devi, on either side of this group are Lord Hayagriva, Lord Varadaraja with his consorts and Gopalkrishna. On the lower most  tier are Lord Venkataramana along with his Divine consorts Sri Devi and Bhoodevi. On either side of this group are Sri Hanuman and Sri Garuda. The saligramas and Naga devatas are installed on a separate Peetha below the Simhasana.

Uthsava Vigraha or Festival Deities
The idol of Lord Venkataramana is used as the Uthsava Vigraha

Sub Deities or Upadevathas
The temple complex consists of an outer ‘prakara’ or quadrangle which includes the shrines of Sri Hanuman, Sri Ganapathy,  Sri Lakshmi & Sri Vitoba-Rakhumai. It also contains a Copper clad Dhwaja Stambha or Flag staff on which the temple flag is hoisted during Brahma Rathotsava. A shrine dedicated to Lord Shiva is located near the temple pond.

Main festivals
 Brahma Rathotsava
 Karthik Pournami
 Navarathri

Worship 
Lord is worshiped in the Temple as per Dwaitha traditions.

All the Aradhana is done by hereditary Goud Saraswat Brahmin priests, who have performed the services for generations. Only these priests have the right to touch and offer services to the Lord. These set of Archakas are called Bhat.

How to Reach
The temple is near Mukund Maller road, about 0.5 km from Thalassery Railway station and Bus stand. The nearest airport is Kannur International Airport (24.5 km).

See also

Goud Saraswat Brahmin
Goud Saraswat Brahmin
Goud Saraswat Brahmins of Cochin
List of Goud Saraswat Brahmins
GSB Temples in Kerala

Maths Followed By Goud Saraswat Brahmin
Kashi Math
Gokarna Math
Shri Gaudapadacharya Math
Chitrapur Math

References

External links

GSB Temples 
                  Sree Ananteswar Temple - Manjeswar
           Old TD Temple - Alappuzha
          Sree Krishna Swami Temple - Kozhencherry
                 Sree Venugopala Swamy Temple - Purakkad
           TD Temple - Cochin (Gosree Puram)
             Sree Venugopala Krishna Swamy Temple - Chendamangalam
    Sree Rama temple - Tripunithura
  Sree Varadaraja Venkataramana Temple - Kasargod
       Sree Varadaraja Venkataramana Temple - Gurpur
      Sree Venkataramana Temple - Mangalore
                Sree Venkataramana Temple - Karkala (Padu Tirupati)
                Sree Venkataramana Temple - Mulki
          Sree Veera Vittala Venkatramana Swamy Temple - Panemangalore
 Sree Veera Vittala Temple - Kumble
 www.tdemple.org 

Temple
Buildings and structures in Thalassery
1831 establishments in India
19th-century Hindu temples
Religious buildings and structures completed in 1831
Narasimha temples